George Musgrove (21 January 1854 – 21 January 1916) was an English-born Australian theatre producer.

Early life
Musgrove was born at Surbiton, England, the son of Thomas John Watson Musgrove, an accountant, and his wife, Fanny Hodson, an actress and sister of Georgiana Rosa Hodson who married William Saurin Lyster.  Fanny's brother was composer, singer and comedian George Alfred Hodson, the father of Henrietta Hodson, a well known London actress, who married Henry Labouchère.
Musgrove was brought to Australia by his parents in January 1863 when he was nine years old. He was educated at the Flinders School, Geelong, Victoria, and on leaving school was given a position as treasurer by Lyster. Musgrave married Emily Fisk Knight at All Saints Church, St Kilda, on 1 August 1874.

Opera and theatre career
Musgrove visited England in 1879, a time when Gilbert and Sullivan had commenced their operas. At the end of 1880, Musgrove produced La fille du tambour-major at the Opera House, Melbourne, which had a record run of 101 nights.  This success led the young producer to join a partnership with J. C. Williamson and Arthur Garner. They formed the Williamson, Garner and Musgrove company in July 1882 when they became joint lessees of the Theatre Royal, Melbourne and Theatre Royal, Sydney. The partnership split in March 1890 following Williamson and Musgrove falling out. 

Williamson and Garner continued to run the Theatre Royal and Princess Theatre in Melbourne, and Musgrove taking control of the Theatre Royal in Sydney. Musgrove managed a successful season of Paul Jones with Marion Burton and Nellie Stewart in the leading parts.  At the end of 1892, Williamson and Musgrove went into partnership again with the pantomime Little Red Riding Hood, which opened a new "Lyceum" theatre on Pitt Street, Sydney. The combination continued for about seven years, Musgrove living much of the time in London.  In 1898 he brought a complete American company to the Shaftesbury Theatre, London, to play The Belle of New York, which had an enormous success.

In 1900 Musgrove took a grand opera company to Australia, consisting mainly of artists from the Carl Rosa Opera Company with Gustave Slapoffski as the conductor, which performed Tannhäuser, The Flying Dutchman and many other well-known operas.  In 1903 he was responsible for acclaimed productions of Shakespeare, played in several cities in Australia, including Twelfth Night, or What You Will, As You Like It, and A Midsummer Night's Dream.  Also in 1902–03, he presented Nellie Melba in her first and most successful concert tour of Australia and New Zealand, managed by Thomas P. Hudson.

In 1907 Musgrove produced a German grand opera company that introduced Die Walküre (The Valkyrie), Romeo and Juliet and Hänsel und Gretel to the Australian public, again under the baton of Gustave Slapoffski. Another opera season in 1909 was less successful. In his last years, Musgrove suffered from financial worries and poor health. In late 1914 Musgrove produced David Belasco's play Du Barry in Melbourne with his lover Nellie Stewart in the title role as well as his daughter Nancye Stewart as Marie Antoinette, age 16. Musgrove died suddenly at his home in Sydney on 21 January 1916, his sixty-second birthday.

Personality and family
Musgrove could be brusque but was known as a kind-hearted, considerate employer of his artistes. He was reputed to value artistic quality over profitability.  
Musgrove's marriage produced two daughters, Emily Musgrove and Rose Musgrove, an actress in comedies and Edwardian musical comedies.  His eldest daughter, Lily Musgrove, married Melbourne barrister Casimir Zichy-Woinarski in 1898.
His third daughter, Nancye Doris Stewart, was also known as Nancye Doris Lynton, (1893–1973), the child of his lover, actress and singer Nellie Stewart.

His brother Harry Musgrove (c. 1861 – 2 November 1931) was also involved in theatre management. He had two sons, Harry and Victor, and a daughter, actress Georgie Musgrove.
Harry George Musgrove (c. 1883 – 27 April 1951) who, with E. J. Carroll and Dan Carroll, founded the magnificent Prince Edward Theatre on Castlereagh Street, Sydney, later bankrupt.

Legacy 
Musgrove Opera, an opera company which bears his name, was founded in Sydney in 2018. The company debuted at the Zenith Theatre, Chatswood with a production of "Pinocchio!" which  subsequently toured to South Coast NSW. More recently, the company has performed a series of concerts in the Utzon Room at the Sydney Opera House. Australian conductor Lachlan Massey acts as its founding Artistic Director.

References

1854 births
1916 deaths
Australian theatre managers and producers
English emigrants to colonial Australia
19th-century Australian businesspeople